Mwenga is a territory in the province of South Kivu in the Democratic Republic of Congo .

 
Lake Tanganyika
Territories of South Kivu Province